is a railway station in Yamatotakada, Nara Prefecture, Japan.

Line
Kintetsu Railway
Osaka Line

Layout
The elevated station has two side platforms serving a track each.

Platforms

Adjacent stations

Railway stations in Nara Prefecture